Neostreptognathodus is an extinct genus of conodonts from the Cisuralian (Early Permian).

Use in stratigraphy 
The top of the Artinskian (the base of the Kungurian) stage is defined as the place in the stratigraphic record where fossils of conodont species Neostreptognathodus pnevi and Neostreptognathodus exculptus first appear.

Neostreptognathodus costatus is from the Early Permian Amushan Formation in Xiwuzhumuqin Qi, Inner Mongolia, in China.

References

External links 

 
 

Conodont genera
Permian conodonts
Cisuralian animals